Notre-Dame-du-Mont-Carmel is a parish municipality in the Mauricie region of the province of Quebec in Canada.

Demographics 

Government 
The mayor is the municipality's highest elected official. Officially, mayoral elections in Notre-Dame-du-Mont-Carmel are on a non-partisan basis. The following list may be incomplete.

Related article 
 La Gabelle Generating Station

References

External links

 https://web.archive.org/web/20110529035007/http://mont-carmel.org/Default.aspx?idPage=1

Parish municipalities in Quebec
Incorporated places in Mauricie
Les Chenaux Regional County Municipality